NWA All Access is a professional wrestling streaming package offered by the National Wrestling Alliance (NWA) and distributed by FITE TV. Launched in January 2022, as part an expanded partnership between the NWA and FITE, All Access includes past and upcoming pay-per-view events, premiere episodes of NWA Power, and the Lightning One-era library of NWA television and documentary series.

Programming 
 All NWA pay-per-view events.
 Premiere episodes NWA Powerrr, the promotion's flagship show.
 All episodes of NWA television series, including NWA USA.
 Ten Pounds of Gold, a documentary series chronicling the journey and career of the current NWA Worlds Heavyweight Champion as well as others in the division.

See also
List of professional wrestling streaming services

References

National Wrestling Alliance
2022 establishments in the United States
Internet properties established in 2022
Internet television channels
Subscription video streaming services
Professional wrestling streaming services
Streaming media systems